Tallavajjala Sundaram (Telugu: సుందరం మాస్టారు; 29 October 1950 – 21 March 2022) was a Telugu stage actor, director and writer.

Biography
Sundaram was born on 29 October 1950 in Ongole, Andhra Pradesh. After completing his BSc, he completed his PG Diploma in Performing Arts at Osmania University. After settling in Hyderabad, he devoted his life to drama writing and performing.

Sundaram died of a heart attack on 21 March 2022 at his residence in Chikkadpally, Hyderabad.

Personal life
He married Sirisha, who died four years before his death. He had a son and a daughter.

References

1950 births
2022 deaths
Telugu male actors
Indian male stage actors
Indian theatre directors
People from Ongole